Jörundur Áki Sveinsson (born 1 June 1971) is an Icelandic football manager.

References

1971 births
Living people
Jorundur Aki Sveinsson
Jorundur Aki Sveinsson
Jorundur Aki Sveinsson